John Joseph Drury (28 May 1874 – 16 October 1919) was an English cricketer.  Drury was a right-handed batsman who bowled right-arm fast.  He was born at Kimberley, Nottinghamshire.

Drury made his first-class debut for Nottinghamshire against Lancashire in the 1899 County Championship.  He made two further first-class appearances in that season's competition, against Surrey and Sussex.  He made a fourth and final first-class appearance for the county in 1902 against the Marylebone Cricket Club. In his four first-class appearances for the county, he scored a total of 21 runs at an average of 7.00, with a high score of 19.  With the ball, he took 4 wickets at a bowling average of 17.75, with best figures of 1/1.

He died at Dobcross, Yorkshire, on 16 October 1919.

References

External links
John Drury at ESPNcricinfo
John Drury at CricketArchive

1874 births
1919 deaths
People from Kimberley, Nottinghamshire
Cricketers from Nottinghamshire
English cricketers
Nottinghamshire cricketers
People from Saddleworth